Kentucky Route 1934 (KY 1934) is a  state highway in the U.S. State of Kentucky. Its southern terminus is at U.S. Route 31W (US 31W), US 60 and KY 841 in Louisville and its northern terminus is at KY 2054 in Louisville.

Major junctions

References

1934
1934
Transportation in Louisville, Kentucky